The City of Norwich School, more commonly known as CNS, is a coeducational secondary school and sixth form with academy status in Norwich, England.

History
In 1910, the Education Committee decided to merge the King Edward VI Middle School in Norwich with the Municipal and Presbyterian Schools for boys to create the new City of Norwich School, a boys' grammar school, which was to be built at Eaton.

Grammar school
It had around 950 boys in 1960, and around 850 in 1969 when administered by the Norwich Education Committee.

Comprehensive
It became a comprehensive in 1970 at which point its name changed to Eaton (City of Norwich) School and co-educational in 1971. Three female sixth-formers were admitted in 1972 (Hazel, Marian and Mary.) The school was refurbished in 2007. The Arc is a new building, as is the Skinner Centre.

Academy
Previously a community school administered by Norfolk County Council, City of Norwich School converted to academy status on 1 September 2014 and is now sponsored by Ormiston Academies Trust. However the school continues to co-ordinate with Norfolk County Council for admissions.

Admissions
It has over 1,500 pupils and currently employs over 190 staff. As well as being a secondary comprehensive school the school also has a sixth form, in partnership with the smaller Hethersett High School, with 791 pupils.

It is situated just west of the A146 ring road (former A47), with the A11 to the north and the A140 to the south. Eaton Golf Club is next door to the south-west.

House system
The pupils from Years 7 to 11 at CNS are split into five houses named after notable coastal villages in Norfolk: Blakeney, Holkham, Kelling, Thornham and Winterton. Their house colours are Blue, Purple, Green, Yellow and Red respectively. Pupils in Year 12 and 13 are not categorised into houses and instead belong as a singular community known as CNS Sixth Form.

Charities Week
CNS Charities Week is a week usually the last school week before Christmas where the pupils and members of staff attempt to raise as much money as possible for a charity of the school's choice. The week involves antics such as Total Wipeout, The X Factor, a teacher auction and CNS Got Talent.

Notable former pupils
 Rebecca Grinter, academic
 Robert Green, footballer
 Neil Shephard, FBA, Frank B. Baird Jr., Professor of Science, Professor of Economics and Professor of Statistics, Harvard University. Head of Department of Statistics, Harvard University.  
 Peter Trudgill, linguist

City of Norwich School (boys' grammar school)

 Michael Andrews (artist)
 Sir Kenneth Blaxter, Director from 1965 to 1982 of the Rowett Research Institute, President from 1970 to 1971 of the British Society of Animal Production, from 1974 to 1975 of The Nutrition Society and from 1986 to 1988 of the Institute of Biology
 Jack Boddy MBE, general secretary from 1978 to 1982 of the National Union of Agricultural and Allied Workers
 Arthur Roy Clapham CBE, Professor of Botany from 1944 to 1969 at the University of Sheffield, President from 1967 to 1970 of the Linnean Society of London
 Christopher Dainty, Professor of Applied Physics since 2002 at the National University of Ireland, Galway, President from 1990 to 1993 of the International Commission for Optics and from 2002 to 2004 of the European Optical Society
 Melvyn Greaves, Professor of Cell Biology at the Institute of Cancer Research, and expert on haematological malignancy
 David Holbrook, writer, poet and academic
 Alan Howard, Wilkins Fellow of Downing College, Cambridge and inventor of the Cambridge diet
 Edmund Lawson, barrister
 Cecil Alec Mace, Professor of Psychology from 1944 to 1961 at Birkbeck College, and President from 1952–3 of the British Psychological Society
 Bernard Matthews CBE, food executive
 Bernard Meadows, Professor of Sculpture from 1960 to 1980 at the Royal College of Art
 Adrian Newland, Professor of Haematology since 1992 at Barts and The London School of Medicine and Dentistry, President from 1998 to 1999 of the British Society for Haematology
 Peter Oakley, pensioner from Bakewell, Derbyshire, England; better known by his pseudonym geriatric1927 on YouTube
 Thomas Piercy, clarinetist
 George Plunkett (1913–2006), photographer
 Malcolm Quantrill, Distinguished Professor of Architecture from 1986 to 2007 at Texas A&M University
 Tony Sheridan musician
 Jeremy C. Smith (scientist), Governor's Chair for Biophysics, University of Tennessee, since 2006
 Steve Smith (academic), Vice Chancellor, University of Exeter
 Very Rev John Southgate, Dean of York from 1984 to 1994
 Graeme K Talboys, writer – attended the school for the first two years of his secondary education
 Robert H. Thouless, President from 1949 to 1950 of the British Psychological Society who wrote Straight and Crooked Thinking in 1930
 Prof Peter Trudgill, academic and author, Professor of English Linguistics from 1998-2005 at the University of Fribourg (Switzerland)
 George Willis, Labour MP from 1945-50 for Edinburgh North, and from 1954 to 1970 for Edinburgh East

King Edward VI Middle School
 Louis Martin, Professor of Technical Optics from 1943 to 1951 at Imperial College London
 Sir Graham Savage CB, architect of the comprehensive school system

References

External links
 The City of Norwich School website

Secondary schools in Norfolk
Schools in Norwich
Educational institutions established in 1910
1910 establishments in England
Academies in Norfolk
Ormiston Academies